William John Wentworth-FitzWilliam (7 August 1852 – 11 September 1889), was a British Liberal politician.

Wentworth-FitzWilliam was the fifth son of William Wentworth-FitzWilliam, 6th Earl FitzWilliam, and his wife Lady Frances Harriet, daughter of George Douglas, 17th Earl of Morton. William Wentworth Fitzwilliam, Viscount Milton, was his elder brother and William Wentworth-FitzWilliam, 7th Earl FitzWilliam, his nephew. He entered Parliament for Peterborough in 1878, a seat he held until his death.

Wentworth-FitzWilliam died at Wentworth house in September 1889, aged 37, after he was thrown from his horse.

See also
Earl FitzWilliam

References

External links 
 

1852 births
1889 deaths
Younger sons of earls
Liberal Party (UK) MPs for English constituencies
UK MPs 1874–1880
UK MPs 1880–1885
UK MPs 1885–1886
UK MPs 1886–1892
Politics of Peterborough
Liberal Unionist Party MPs for English constituencies